The Council of Acre met at Palmarea, near Acre, a major city of the crusader Kingdom of Jerusalem, on 24 June 1148. The Haute Cour of Jerusalem met with recently arrived crusaders from Europe, to decide on the best target for the crusade. The Second Crusade had been called after the fall of Edessa to Zengi in 1144. In 1147, armies led by Conrad III of Germany and Louis VII of France began their separate journeys to the east. Conrad arrived at Acre in April 1148, and Louis marched south from Antioch.

The nobility of Jerusalem welcomed the arrival of troops from Europe, and it was announced that a council should meet. After much discussion, it was determined that the crusaders would march against Damascus. Whatever the reasons for the Siege of Damascus were, the results were disastrous for the crusaders. As a result, Antioch, which lay in closer proximity than Damascus to Jerusalem, was to become vulnerable. William of Tyre recorded numerous participants at the Council.

Background

The Second Crusade had been called after the fall of Edessa to Zengi in 1144. In 1147, armies led by Conrad III of Germany and Louis VII of France began their separate journeys to the east; after passing through Constantinople, Conrad suffered a heavy defeat in Anatolia, and retreated to meet Louis at Nicaea. Conrad then spent the winter in Constantinople while Louis continued south to the Mediterranean coast, harassed by the Turks along the way, and finally sailed to Antioch, then ruled by Raymond of Poitiers, uncle of his wife Eleanor of Aquitaine. Conrad arrived at Acre in April, and Louis marched south from Antioch. The nobility of Jerusalem welcomed the arrival of troops from Europe, and it was announced that a council should meet in Acre; as William of Tyre says, "together with the nobles of the realm who possessed an accurate knowledge of affairs and places, they entered into a careful consideration as to what plan was most expedient."

Target of the crusaders

There were a number of choices for the target of the crusade. In northern Syria, Edessa was firmly in the control of Nur ad-Din, the successor of Zengi; its count, Joscelin II, was in captivity and there was no hope of retrieving him or the city, so the matter, so important to the original call for the crusade, was apparently not even discussed. In Antioch, Raymond of Poitiers had tried to convince Louis to attack Aleppo, Nur ad-Din's capital and the greatest threat to that city, but Raymond and Louis had quarrelled (partly over rumours of an incestual relationship between Eleanor and the prince) and Raymond was not present at the Council. The County of Tripoli was also not represented, although an attack on Aleppo would have benefitted Tripoli as well; however, the rule of Raymond II of Tripoli was challenged by Alfonso Jordan, Count of Toulouse, his cousin, and when Alfonso was poisoned on the way to the Council, Raymond was implicated in his murder. Conrad and Louis were, in any case, unconcerned with matters in northern Syria; for them, pilgrimage to Jerusalem was an inherent part of the crusading vow, and defense of Jerusalem was of utmost importance.

In the south, the most immediate threats to Jerusalem came from Ascalon and Damascus. The crusade had coincidentally arrived during a political crisis in Jerusalem: King Baldwin III had ruled jointly with his mother Melisende since the death of King Fulk of Jerusalem in 1143, when Baldwin was only 13 years old; but Baldwin was now 18 and wished to assert his authority. The option of Ascalon did not suit Baldwin, since his brother Amalric, who supported their mother, was already Count of Jaffa and Ascalon would have been added to his territory. Ascalon had also been contained by a number of castles built during the reign of Fulk and was not an immediate threat. The capture of Damascus, on the other hand, would benefit Baldwin; despite being a sometime-ally of Jerusalem, Nur ad-Din also desired it, and capturing it would help limit the emir's power. It would please Conrad and Louis, who were interested in capturing a city which, unlike Ascalon, was important to the history of Christianity. It was therefore determined that the crusaders should march against Damascus. William of Tyre passes over these discussions, saying only that "various opinions of diverse factions were offered and arguments pro and con presented, as is customary in matters of such importance. At last it was agreed by all that under the circumstances it would be best to besiege Damascus, a city of great menace to us."

Aftermath of the council
Whatever the reasons for the Siege of Damascus were, the results were disastrous for the crusaders. The combined forces besieged the city in July, but the campaign was a terrible blunder and failed after only four days. The crusaders blamed each other and there were rumours of bribery. Conrad and Louis lingered in Jerusalem for some time, accomplishing nothing, before returning to Europe. Just as had been feared, Nur ad-Din used the opportunity to impose his power over Damascus, and was in personal control of the city by 1154. The general historical debate now appears to view the decision to attack Damascus as somewhat inevitable. The campaign is viewed by historians, such as Martin Hoch, that the decision was the logical conclusion of Damascene foreign policy shifting into alignment with the Zengid dynasty. King Baldwin III had previously launched a campaign with the sole objective of capturing the city. This aided in shifting the Burid dynasty's relations with the Kingdom of Jerusalem.

The original target of the crusade, Edessa, was an unfeasible target in any case. King Baldwin III was locked in a family dispute with his mother Queen Melisende over territory in Nablus and would therefore be reluctant to campaign in the North. This was echoed by the general consensus of the nobility of Jerusalem, who wished to strike out the threat of increasing Zengid influence in Damascus. If the city fell to the army of an enemy, which it did in 1154, the strategic importance of the city would allow for a campaign to be assembled directly into the heartland of Jerusalem. The Byzantine-Antioch treaty of 1137, which outlined the rights of the Byzantine Emperor to former Byzantine lands captured by the crusading armies, would also persuade many not to campaign in the North. Despite this, an attack on a neutral territory for the benefit of Jerusalem would compromise security in the North, particularly with the growing strength of the Zengid dynasty in the territory around Aleppo and, from 1144, Edessa. By deciding against a campaign at Aleppo, Antioch, which lay closer than Damascus to Jerusalem, was to become vulnerable.

Participants

William of Tyre lists numerous participants at the Council. The Germans and others allied to the Holy Roman Empire included:

Conrad III of Germany
Otto, Bishop of Freising
Stephan of Bar, Bishop of Metz
Heinrich I von Lothringen, Bishop of Toul
Theodwin, Bishop of Porto, papal legate
Henry II Jasomirgott, Duke of Bavaria and Margrave of Austria
Duke Welf VI
Frederick III, Duke of Swabia
Herman III, Margrave of Baden
Berthold III of Andechs
William V, Marquess of Montferrat
Guido, Count of Biandrate

There were also "other noted men of high rank, whose names and titles we do not recall." Otto of Freising would later write the Gesta Friderici, a history of Holy Roman Emperor Frederick Barbarossa, who himself attended the Council while still only Duke of Swabia. He lists Conrad, Henry of Bavaria, Welf, and Frederick, as well as Ortlieb, Bishop of Basel, and Arnold of Wied, Conrad's chancellor, "and other counts and illustrious men and nobles"; however, he passes over the Council and the siege completely, saying "what issue and event this expedition to Damascus also experienced must be related elsewhere, and possibly by others." From the French, participants included:

Louis VII of France
Godefroy de la Rochetaillée, Bishop of Langres
Arnulf, Bishop of Lisieux
Guy of Florence, cardinal priest of San Crisogono, papal legate
Robert I of Dreux
Henry I, Count of Champagne
Thierry, Count of Flanders
Ivo de Nesle

"Many other important nobles of high rank were also present...but since it would take too long to record them here, their names are intentionally omitted." From the Kingdom of Jerusalem, attendees included:

Baldwin III of Jerusalem
Melisende of Jerusalem
Patriarch Fulk of Jerusalem
Baldwin, Archbishop of Caesarea
Robert, Archbishop of Nazareth
Rorgo, Bishop of Acre
Bernard, Bishop of Sidon
William, Bishop of Beirut
Adam, Bishop of Banyas
Gerald, Bishop of Bethlehem
Robert of Craon, Grand Master of the Knights Templar
Raymond du Puy de Provence, Grand Master of the Knights Hospitaller
Manasses of Hierges
Philip of Nablus
Elinand of Tiberias
Gerard Grenier
Walter of Caesarea
Pagan the Butler
Barisan of Ibelin
Humphrey II of Toron
Guy I Brisebarre of Beirut

"...and many others."

References

Bibliography

Further reading
Steven Runciman, A History of the Crusades, vol. II: The Kingdom of Jerusalem and the Frankish East, 1100–1187. Cambridge University Press, 1952; repr. Folio Society, 1994.
James Brundage, The Crusades: A Documentary History. Milwaukee, WI: Marquette University Press, 1962.
M. W. Baldwin, ed. "The first hundred years," vol. 1 of A History of the Crusades, ed. Kenneth M. Setton. Madison, WI: University of Wisconsin Press, 1969.
Jonathan Riley-Smith, Atlas of the Crusades. New York: Facts on File, 1991.
Jonathan Phillips, The Second Crusade: Extending the Frontiers of Christendom. Yale University Press, 2007.

1148 in Asia
Kingdom of Jerusalem
12th-century church councils